David Egan may refer to:

 David Egan (jockey), Irish jockey
 David Egan (musician) (1954–2016), American singer-songwriter
 David Egan (soccer), American soccer player